Suillus acerbus is a species of bolete fungus in the family Suillaceae. It was first described scientifically by American mycologists Alexander H. Smith and Harry D. Thiers in 1964.

See also
List of North American boletes

References

External links

acerbus
Fungi described in 1964
Fungi of North America